Brugge (M942) is the fifth ship in the City / Vlissingen-class mine countermeasures vessels, and third to be built for the Belgian Navy.

References

Mine warfare vessel classes
Minehunters of Belgium